A spintria (plural, spintriae) is a small bronze or brass Roman token, possibly for use in brothels, although none of the literature on the spintriae contains any evidence to support this assertion. The tokens usually depict on the obverse a motif of sexual acts or symbols and a numeral in the range I - XVI on the reverse.

Name
Spintria was used by Suetonius to refer to young male prostitutes, from Greek  σφιγκτήρ (sphinktḗr, [anal] sphincter). In the 16th century, the name passed from the ancient sense of the persons committing outrageous acts – in other words, sexual and/or sensual acts outside what was considered the norm – (or the place where outrageous acts occurred, such as Tiberius' gardens on the isle of Capri) to the tokens themselves.

Bette Talvacchia identifies the first usage of the term spintriae to refer to the tokens as occurring in Sebastiano Errizo's 1559 treatise, Discourse Concerning Ancient Medals (Sopra le Medaglie Antiche, Venice, 1559).

Use
Some scholars, following Friedlander's (1886) suggestion that the tokens were used "auf die man in Bordelle Einlass erhielt" ("to obtain entry to brothels"), have argued that spintriae were used to pay prostitutes, although none offer any supporting evidence. Buttrey is dismissive of the brothel token idea,  asserting "there is no evidence for any of this" (Buttrey 1973, p. 53). Currently, only Simonetta and Riva are supporters of the brothel token hypothesis, which is also popular with the media (see Duggan 2016); other scholars pursue alternate lines of enquiry (Buttrey; Campana; Duggan; Fishburn; etc.). Under Caracalla, an equestrian was sentenced to death for bringing a coin with the emperor's likeness into a brothel; he was spared only by the emperor's own death. There is no direct ancient evidence, however, to support the theory that spintriae were created as tokens for exchange in place of official coinage.  Numismatist Theodore V. Buttrey suggests that they were used as game pieces. although Duggan (2016) notes there are no archaeological finds to confirm the spintriae were gaming pieces. 

It has been suggested that the most plausible explanation seems to be that they were used as locker tokens in suburban baths.

On the walls of baths there are frescos that have been painted with sexual scenes that are the same as the ones on the coins. On these sexual scenes painted on the frescos there were also "...accompanying numerals, as appear on the reverses" of the coins. When the spintria was given as a token it gave a person access to a locker where clothes could be stored while bathing.<ref name="2021 spintriae coins erotic"></}}</ref>

Spintriae coins also do not have wearing that is evident on coins that have been in mass circulation and there are also relatively few compared with the amount of official coins that exist. The spintriae coins were also all produced at a single office between the years 22-37 AD, a short period of time.

Another idea is that they were  possibly an attempt at increasing revenue. This attempt may have been related to the prohibition of carrying coins into brothels that had an image of the emperor on them.  After a short amount of time they may have been able to see that if it were to continue it could have adverse effects for brothels or bring them to a standstill and they ceased being used.

Appearance
They were usually struck from brass or bronze, and were little smaller than a 50 euro cent coin (€0.50). 

They show images of sexual scenes involving male and female figures and five spintriae have been given the description of "Male lovers on bed".

Gallery

See also

Erotic art in Pompeii and Herculaneum
Homosexuality in ancient Greece
Homosexuality in ancient Rome
Pederasty in ancient Greece
Prostitution in ancient Rome
Roman currency
Sexuality in ancient Rome
Tessera

Notes

References
 Buttrey, T. V. (1973) 'The Spintriae as a Historical Source', The Numismatic Chronicle 13, pp. 52 – 63.
 Campana, A. (2009) 'Le spintriae: tessere Romane con raffigurazione erotiche', La Donna Romana: Immagini E Vita Quotidiana Atti de Convegno. Astina, 7 Marzo 2009. pp. 43 – 96.
 Duggan, E. (2016) "Stranger Games: The Life and Times of the Spintriae".
 Jacobelli, L. (1995) Le pitture erotiche delle Terme Suburban di Pompeii. L'Erma di Bretschneider. Rome.
 
  
 Talvacchia, Bette, 1999, Taking Positions: On the Erotic in Renaissance Culture, Princeton NJ: Princeton University Press.
 Talvacchia, Bette, 1997, 'Classical Paradigms and Renaissance Antequarianism in Giulio Romano's "I Modi"', I Tatti Studies in the Italian Renaissance 7 (1999) pp. 81–188.

External links

Prime sources
"Is that a spintria in your pocket, or are you just pleased to see me?", Geoffrey Fishburn, University of Queensland, Australia
Straight Dope on spintria 
The Collaborative Numismatics Project -- dated

Images
Selection from the extensive holdings of the Hunterian Collection, Glasgow

Coins of ancient Rome
Prostitution in ancient Rome
Ancient Roman erotic art